Lakhon Khol or Khmer Masked Theatre is a dance drama genre that is performed in Cambodia.

History 
Lakhon Khol is a traditional theatre performance of Cambodia.  
Lakhon Khol is believed to be a derivative of the Drama, acronym in the High Priest's Dictionary Chuon Nath. That short forms can be interpreted as a form of drama, played out in a series of short stories.
The word Khol Is encountered in a number of other rocks, such as K.566-a a rock above the Stung Sreng Siem Reap province inscribed at the end of the 10th century Which refers to wearing a mask dance. The theatrical drama was developed from the Khmer shadow theatre called "Lakhon Sbeak Thom; ”. 
Lakhon Khol was recorded by Henri Mouhot at a restaurant dinner with a dance performance in the Royal Palace in the city Oudong with King Ang Duong in 1856. 
 Until the Royal King Sisowath, the royal dance in the form of dance was frequently performed for French diplomats or anthropologists to be entertained by the love of Khmer classical dance.George Groslier compiled the diary "Danseuses Cambodgiennes, Anciennes & Modernes" 1913. Royal dance in the form of Lakhon Khol means that the king royal dance is a form of dance masks. The evolution of Cambodian dance art is linked to nature, social class, and Brahmin religion, the original religion of the country India, Hindu religion, which is related to the story incorporated into the art of Cambodian dance, the liveliness of Cambodian dances are recorded by George Coedes (La dance du Cambodge) in 1944.

Lakhon Khol reappeared once again in the 20th century in King Sisowath and continued to King Norodom Sihanouk in 1948, after the end of the World War II by organizing a rehearsal Initially, he visited the Vegetable History at (Lakhon Khol Wat Svay Andet) in Kandal Province, which performed theatrical theatre for rainfall and peace to the community every year. The visit to Norodom Sihanouk 's Wat Svay Andet masked dance theatre was published in 1948 as the first magazine in the journal "Kampuchea Soriya" by Tep Pitur Chhim Krasem or Duke of (Krosem Kuntheak Bondit). In the Soriya Magazine (March 3, 1948), the 3rd edition was published in March 1948, titled "The Lakhon Khol Wat Svay Andet" and stated in the NPL "The theatre is limited to the only thing related to Hinduism. Which only plays for the divinities of divisions, such as Reamker and some other things." Later, there was a Giant with Hanuman statue iconic Lakhon Khol In Phnom Penh in 1954, after independence from France, but the statue lost and instead the Chuon Nath statue still remains.

Another specific story of the theatrical performance is the Reamker, the Khmer legend of the Ramayana. The performance includes an introduction to storytellers who play an important role in the performance and classical music of the Pin Peat. The theatre was popular in the Lon Nol era, and then became King Sihanouk's favourite wife. Two new groups started in the war, including the Kampong Thom and National Theater troupes from the Department of Fine Arts and the Ministry of Culture and Fine Arts. And now the drama is also part of the schedule of studies at the University of Fine Arts. Lakhon Khol was Inscribed in a tentative list of UNESCO intangible culture heritage as Urgent safeguarding on March 31, 2017, by the Ministry of culture and fine art.

On November 28, 2018, Lkhon Khol Wat Svay Andet was included in the List of Intangible Cultural Heritage in Need of Urgent Safeguarding of UNESCO.

Lakhon Khol Characters 

Lakhon Khol Characters is divided into 4 forms types of masks actors

Devas Characters

19 Monkeys General Characters

Asura Characters

Animals Creatures Characters

The Group Local of Lakhon Khol  
 Lakhon Khol Phnom Penh
 Lakhon Khol Battambang Province
 Lakhon Khol Pursat Province
 Lakhon Khol Kampong Thom Province
 Lakhon Khol Wat Svay Andet Kandal Province (List of Intangible Cultural Heritage in Need of Urgent Safeguarding)
 Lakhon Khol Teok Khleang Village Kandal Province
 Lakhon Khol Khoh Rak Village Kandal Province
 Lakhon Khol Tycoon Island Or Khoh Og Nha Tey Kandal Province
 Lakhon Khol Parong Village Kandal Province
 Lakhon Khol Kien Svay pagoda Kandal Province

See also 

Royal Ballet of Cambodia
Dance of Cambodia
Khmer culture
Theatre of Cambodia
Chapei Dang Veng
Lbeng Teanh Prot
Apsara dance
UNESCO intangible world heritage of Cambodia
 Nuon Kan

References

Bibliography

 Carol A. Mortland, et al. (1994). Cambodian Culture since 1975:Homeland and Exile, Cornell University Press
 Theatre in Southeast Asia, by James R. Brandon (Cambridge, MA Harvard University Press 1967)
 Theatre in the East, by Faubion Bowers (New York T. Nelson 1956)
 The Cambridge Guide to Theater, by Martin Banham (Cambridge University Press)
 Dictionary of Traditional Southeast Asian Theatre by Ghulam-Sarwar Yousof.(Oxford University Press. 1994.)
 Sasagawa, Hideo (2005). Post/colonial Discourses on the Cambodian Court Dance[permanent dead link], Southeast Asian Studies, Vol. 42, No. 4, March 2005

Notes 

Performing arts in Cambodia
Masked dances
Masquerade ceremonies in Asia